The 1979 Navy Midshipmen football team represented the United States Naval Academy as an independent during the 1979 NCAA Division I-A football season.

Schedule

Personnel

Game summaries

Air Force

Navy had 107 yards of penalties but prevailed 13–9.

vs. Army

Navy evened all-time series at 37–37–6
Eddie Meyers set single game school rushing record

References

Navy
Navy Midshipmen football seasons
Navy Midshipmen football